Swansea is a town at the entrance to Lake Macquarie from the Pacific Ocean in New South Wales, Australia. It is part of the City of Lake Macquarie local government area, Greater Newcastle. The Aboriginal people, in this area, the Awabakal, were the first people of this land.

Swansea's local industries are coal mining, fishing, boating, and tourism.  There were once several small coal mines. There are also popular fine sandy beaches on the Pacific Ocean, Swansea Channel and Lake Macquarie. It is 25.2 km away from the city of Newcastle, where many residents commute to for work.

References

External links 
 History of Swansea (Lake Macquarie City Library)
 Travel – Swansea (SMH) – includes history

Suburbs of Lake Macquarie